Les Rouies is a mountain in the French Alps. Located in the Massif des Écrins, the mountain is 3,589 m tall.

References 

Mountains of Hautes-Alpes
Mountains of the Alps
Alpine three-thousanders